Ons Jabeur was the defending champion, but chose not to participate.

Richèl Hogenkamp won the title, defeating Lina Gjorcheska in the final, 7–5, 6–4.

Seeds

Draw

Finals

Top half

Bottom half

References
Main Draw

Nana Trophy - Singles